The Sound of One Hand Clapping can refer to:

 The sound of one hand [clapping], a famous Japanese Zen kōan
 The Sound of One Hand Clapping (novel), a 1997 novel by Richard Flanagan
 The Sound of One Hand Clapping (film), a 1998 Australian film adaptation
 The Sound of One Hand Clapping, a 1998 album by British musician Dobie, also released as a remix in 2004

See also
 One Hand Clapping (disambiguation)